The Benjamin H. Carter House is a historic house in Quitman, Mississippi. It was built in 1911-1912 by George Carson for Benjamin Harvey Carter, the sheriff of Clarke County. Carter served as the president of the Bank of Quitman from 1931 to 1961.

The house was designed in the Colonial Revival architectural style. It has been listed on the National Register of Historic Places since May 20, 1994.

References

Houses on the National Register of Historic Places in Mississippi
National Register of Historic Places in Clarke County, Mississippi
Colonial Revival architecture in Mississippi
Houses completed in 1912